Tord Gustavsen (born 5 October 1970) is a Norwegian jazz pianist and composer. He tours extensively worldwide, and he has been a bandleader for a trio, ensemble and quartet at various times, all bearing his name.

Early life
Gustavsen was born on 5 October 1970 in Oslo and raised in rural Hurdal, Akershus. He "grew up playing church music".

Later life and career

Gustavsen holds a bachelor's degree (mellomfag) in psychology at the University of Oslo, before he attended the Trondheim Musikkonsevatorium for a three years study of jazz (1993–96). Thereafter he became a graduate (Cand.philol.) of musicology at the University of Oslo, where he was guest teacher of jazz piano and theory (1998–2002).

Between 2003 and 2007 The Tord Gustavsen Trio released three albums on ECM Records. The trio was made up of Gustavsen on piano, Harald Johnsen on double bass and Jarle Vespestad on drums. The albums "contained rapt, pristine, meditative music, which resonated with the inner needs of a large, discriminating audience": combined sales exceeded 100,000. The trio won the Nattjazz prize in 2005.

A later ensemble was composed of  Gustavsen, Tore Brunborg (saxophones), Mats Eilertsen (bass) and Vespestad (drums). With vocalist Kristin Asbjørnsen added for some tracks, the album Restored, Returned was recorded in 2009. The album was awarded with Spellemannsprisen (the Norwegian Grammy). The quartet's follow-up, The Well, was released in 2012. That year, Gustavsen played over four days at the Montreal Jazz Festival: with the quartet, as a solo pianist and in a duo with vocalist Solveig Slettahjell. The quartet album Extended Circle two years later "reveals a new edginess and dynamic impact that the quartet brings to Gustavsen's music."

In addition, he has recorded as a session musician, and guested on friends' albums. Collaborative projects have included Norwegian jazz vocalist and songwriter Silje Nergaard, musician Carl Petter Opsahl, actress Cecilie Jørstad and drummer Rune Arnesen, duo aire & angels and jazz vocalist Siri Gjære. He also took part in Nymark Collective established by Kåre Nymark. Since 2014 Gustavsen has collaborated with the German-Afghan jazz singer Simin Tander, releasing the album What Was Said (2016). They also performed at the 2016 Vinterjazz and the 2016 Vossajazz in Norway.

Gustavsen continues to be highly interested in psychology and has written a lengthy thesis on the paradoxes of improvisation, drawing on the dialectical psychological theory of Helm Stierlin and Anne-Lise Løvlie Schibbye.

Honors
 2005: Nattjazzprisen (for the Tord Gustavsen Trio)
 2009: Spellemannprisen in the class Jazz (for the Tord Gustavsen Ensemble)

Discography

Albums

Collaborations
aire &  angels duo with Siri Gjære
 aire &  angels (1999)
 aire &  angels II (2002)

Nymark Collective
 First meeting (2000)
 Contemporary tradition (2002)
 Bessie Smith Revisited - Live in concert (2008) - with Kristin Asbjørnsen

Silje Nergaard
 Port of Call (2000)
 At First Light (2001)
 Nightwatch (2003)
 The Essential + Live in Koln[DVD] (2005)

SKRUK
 SKRUK / Rim Banna Krybberom (2003)
 SKRUK / Torun Sævik / Cecilie Jørstad Sommerlandet (2004)
 SKRUK / Nymark Collective dype stille sterke milde (2006)
 SKRUK / Mahsa Vahdat I vinens Speil (2010)

Carl Petter Opsahl
 Indigodalen (Heilo, 2001)
 Improvisions (Park Grammofon, 2005)
 Love, The Blues (Park Grammofon, 2008)

Other projects
 Whoopin (2001)
 Humans & Places (2006) with Ulrich Drechsler Quartet
 ID (2007) with Anna Maria Jopek
 Sorgen og gleden (2008) with various artists
 Natt i Betlehem (2008) with Solveig Slettahjell (Peaked in NOR: #32)

References

External links

Tord Gustavsen Trio Official website

20th-century Norwegian pianists
21st-century Norwegian pianists
Chamber jazz pianists
Norwegian jazz composers
Norwegian jazz pianists
Spellemannprisen winners
Norwegian University of Science and Technology alumni
University of Oslo alumni
Musicians from Hurdal
1970 births
Living people
Tord Gustavsen Ensemble members
ECM Records artists